Harry and Cosh was a British children's television series directed by Daniel Peacock shown on Saturday afternoons on Shake! on Channel 5.

It starred Harry Capehorn, Coshti Dowden, Lucinda Rhodes-Flaherty, Gemma Baker and Linda Regan. It told the story of two teenagers, their relationship problems and dysfunctional families. It ran for 46 episodes from 30 October 1999 to 12 July 2003. Frankie Fitzgerald, Ricky Diamond and Carly Hillman appeared in some episodes as guest stars.

In 2002, it was nominated for a BAFTA.

External links
BFI Film & TV Database: Harry and Cosh

Television shows set in London
Channel 5 (British TV channel) original programming
British teen drama television series
1999 British television series debuts
2003 British television series endings
1990s British children's television series
2000s British children's television series
1990s British teen sitcoms
2000s British teen sitcoms
Television series about teenagers